The Men's Super Globe is a handball competition contested between the champion clubs from continental confederations.

On 7 December 2018, the IHF moved the Super Globe to Saudi Arabia for four years, until 2022.

Summary

Records and statistics

By club

Rq:
''GS Pétroliers (ex. MC Alger)

By country

Participation details

See also
 IHF Women's Super Globe

References

External links

IHF Super Globe

 
International club handball competitions
Super Globe
Multi-national professional sports leagues